Oliver Turnbull (3 June 1919 – 19 February 2009) was a Scotland international rugby union footballer, who played as a centre.

Rugby career

Amateur career

Turnbull played for Kelso. He captained the side; and Kelso shared the 'unofficial' Scottish championship title with Aberdeen GSFP in the 1947-48 season.

He retired from rugby union in 1952.

Provincial career

Turnbull played for South for over a decade.

He also captained the Co-Optimists.

International career

He was capped for  twice in 1951, playing in one Five Nations match of that year, against ; and then he was capped playing against .

He was a late debutant for Scotland, wearing the dark blue shirt for the first time at the age of 32.

Turnbull played for the Barbarians three times in 1951.

Outside of rugby

Turnbull had a year with the King's Own Scottish Borderers.

He worked in foresty and farming. His father owned a sawmill business in Kelso. Turnbull had his farm at Hiltonshill Farm, St. Boswells.

References

1919 births
2009 deaths
Barbarian F.C. players
Kelso RFC players
Rugby union players from Melrose, Scottish Borders
Scotland international rugby union players
Scottish rugby union players
South of Scotland District (rugby union) players
Rugby union centres